Cairn na Burgh Beag is one of the Treshnish Isles in the Inner Hebrides, Scotland.

Cairn na Burgh Beag is the smaller of the two "Carnburgs" (as they are nicknamed) at the northeastern end of the Treshnish Isles in the Inner Hebrides. (The other is Cairn na Burgh Mòr.) Cairnburgh Castle, which guards the entrance to Loch Tuath on the west coast of Mull, is located on the larger of the pair. However, an unusual feature of the castle is that its defences straddle both islands: There is a small guard-house and a well on Cairn na Burgh Beag.
  
Both of these grassy islands are remnants of ancient lava flows, and both have a distinctive profile: They area flat-topped and trimmed with cliffs.

Footnotes

Treshnish Isles
Uninhabited islands of Argyll and Bute